QT8: The First Eight  is a 2019 American documentary film co-produced and directed by Tara Wood. The documentary chronicles the life of filmmaker Quentin Tarantino, from his start at Video Archives up to the release of Once Upon a Time in Hollywood (2019). The film features interviews from the frequent collaborators of his films.

Appearances

 Samuel L. Jackson
 Tim Roth
 Jennifer Jason Leigh
 Diane Kruger
 Kurt Russell
 Christoph Waltz
 Jamie Foxx
 Lucy Liu
 Bruce Dern
 Robert Forster
 Zoë Bell
 Eli Roth
 Michael Madsen
 Stacey Sher
 Scott Spiegel
 Richard N. Gladstein
 Louis Black

Production

Development
In November 2015, about a month away from the release of Tarantino's The Hateful Eight, Tara Wood announced the making of a documentary on Tarantino. Originally titled 21 Years: Quentin Tarantino, it continues Wood's 21 Years documentary series after the release of the 2014 documentary dedicated to Richard Linklater. Early reports mentioned that it would have included interviews from John Travolta, Kerry Washington, Uma Thurman, Brad Pitt (who was busy due to promoting By the Sea), and Pam Grier (who was on the fence to appear).

Distributor
In 2016, the documentary was picked up by The Weinstein Company, who had collaborated on all of Tarantino's films at the time, for an international release, with the exception on the French-speaking market. The film was picked up at that year's Cannes Film Festival.

Following the Harvey Weinstein scandal breaking loose in late 2017, Wood tried to reclaim ownership to the project in the hopes to "allow the project to be handled with the care and consideration it, Mr. Tarantino, and all the participants deserve." The Weinstein Company refused, and the company filed for bankruptcy in March 2018. In July of that same year, the studio's successor Lantern Entertainment was formed and relinquished the film out of the sale by September. Following the ownership return, Wood said in a statement:

The director's company, Wood Entertainment, partnered with Entertainment Squad to release the films in theaters and on demand.

Release
Entertainment Squad release the film in theaters for a one night Fathom Events showing on October 21, 2019.

Home media
The film was released on streaming on December 3, 2019, in the United States and is currently available on Starz. In the United States, the United Kingdom, and in Germany, the film is available on Blu-ray and DVD.

Reception

Box office
Under the Fathom Events showing, the film earned a total gross of $101,346. Playing in over 458 theaters, the film earned a domestic gross of $51,896, and earned $49,450 internationally.

Critical reception
The film has received positive reviews.

Tarantino himself gave a positive response to the film. At a screening of the film, he said:

Notes

References

External links
 Official website
 QT8: The First Eight on Internet Movie Database
 QT8: The First Eight on Rotten Tomatoes

Quentin Tarantino
2019 films
American documentary films
2019 documentary films
American biographical films
2010s English-language films
2010s American films